The Allamprabhu is a unique temple.  Situated on a beautiful hill near a magnificent lake, the uniqueness of this temple is that "both Hindus and Muslims pray in this temple".

Historically, Bhoom was under Nizam of Hyderabad.  On September 17, 1948, the forces of Nizam of Hyderabad surrendered to the Indian forces.  

Hindu temples in Maharashtra